David Scott Alspach, known professionally as Scott Spock, is an American songwriter, record producer and composer.  He is known for being a member of the pop writing and production team The Matrix, who have written and produced many hit singles that have reached #1 worldwide.  Alspach is best known for his songs with Avril Lavigne, Korn, Hilary Duff, Shakira, Jason Mraz, David Bowie, Britney Spears, Christina Aguilera, Liz Phair, Busted and Rihanna.

Life
Scott Spock, from St. Louis, MO began his career as a jazz trumpet player, later becoming a skilled songwriter and programmer. Spock is a member of The Matrix, a music production team including Lauren Christy and Graham Edwards. They gained fame in the early 2000s after producing a series of hits for Avril Lavigne, Britney Spears, OffByOne, Busted, Son of Dork and Hilary Duff. They soon started their own label "Let's Hear It Records" and hope to be releasing an album soon with their first signed artist Lindsay Pagano.

At Southern Illinois University, Spock was awarded Bachelor of Science in Math Studies / Statistics in 1988 and a Bachelor of Music in Music / Jazz Performance in 1989.

Selected discography 
Songs where Spock is credited separately by name for songwriting

References

External links 
 
 Scott spock music | Discogs

Year of birth missing (living people)
Living people